John W. Bischoff (27 November 1850 in Chicago – May 30, 1909 in Washington, DC) was a blind musician and composer. Blind from age two, Bischoff went on to become a noted organist, compiler of musical collections, and composer. His compilations included a significant number of his own works, and include Gospel Bells (1883), God Be With You (1880) and Not Half Has Been Told (1877). He was the principal organist at the first Congregational Church in Washington from 1874 until his death in 1909.

Bischoff lost his sight at about two years of age, and attended the Wisconsin School for the Blind. Later he studied singing with Ludden and Bassini in Chicago and studied organ under Creswald. He moved to Washington, D.C., in 1875 and became the musician at First Congregational church. He was a great composer of music, and was considered one of the greatest composers and greatest organists of the country. For Gospel Bells in 1880, Bischoff worked with noted minister Jeremiah Rankin. He continued to spend time in Wisconsin, and wrote that much of his composing was done during the summer when he would visit his cottage on Lake Winnebago in that state.

Bischoff married Mary Jane Vandergrift, daughter of Howard Vandergrift, in Mount Carroll, Illinois in about 1870. They had met in Fond du Lac, Wisconsin, where Bischoff lived at the time. They had two children, a son and a daughter. They divorced in 1895. His daughter was Lucile and his son was John E.

At his death, he was married to Elisie Bond Bischoff, who was also a musician.

Bischoff died the morning of May 30, 1909 of heart disease after three weeks of illness

References 

http://parlorsongs.com/issues/2003-9/thismonth/feature.php

External links
 

1850 births
1909 deaths
American classical composers
American male classical composers
Blind classical musicians
19th-century American male musicians